Xinyao is a genre of songs that is unique to Singapore. It is a contemporary Mandarin vocal genre that emerged and rose to fame in Singapore between the late 1970s to 1980s. Xinyao songs are composed and sung by Singaporeans and it is an outlet for them to express their thoughts and feelings around themes like friendships or love stories. Xinyao is a Chinese noun comprising two words: Xīn (新) which is an abbreviation for Singapore, and yáo (谣) for song. The extended form is Xīnjiāpō gēyáo (新加坡歌谣), which simply means "Singapore songs".

Xinyao can be clearly identified by its distinctive style of Mandarin genre, that is conveyed through poetic lyrics with clean acoustic accompaniments. Often, a group of people sing and harmonize together, accompanied solely by the guitar. As the movement grew and became semi-commercialized in the early 1990s, more sophisticated accompaniments like drums and castanets were adopted.

Early pioneers of this style of music include Wong Hong Mok, Liang Wern Fook, Dawn Gan, Eric Moo and Billy Koh, who discovered and groomed many successful Singapore artistes in the Asia Chinese-Pop music scene (including Kit Chan, A-Do and JJ Lin).

History

Birth of Xinyao
In the Chinese music scene, the local xinyao movement started in the mid-1980s and was the source of a number of success stories in today's regional Chinese pop music industry. This genre was started by a group of students (mainly secondary schools, junior colleges and polytechnics), who were influenced by minyao (民谣), a Taiwanese folk songs movement in the 1970s, school campus songs (校园民歌) from Taiwan. The Taiwanese folk genre sought an authentic native Taiwan identity exemplified by songs such as "Grandma's Penghu Bay" (外婆的澎湖湾). The rise in popularity of the school campus song movement (校园民歌) especially among the Chinese students and schools came at a time of major education reforms led by then Deputy Prime Minister and Education Minister Mr Goh Keng Swee which sought to streamline and align Chinese education into the national syllabus, which can be interpreted as a spontaneous reaction to assert identity against these change.

In September 1982, Nanyang Technological University's Chinese-language newspaper, Nanyang Business Daily, organised a seminar titled The Song We Sing (我们唱着歌). The seminar revolved around discussing the emerging trend of xinyao, which was representative of Singaporean composed schoolyard songs at that time. Furthermore, it was also during the 1980s that the term xinyao was coined and popularised in Singapore.

1980s: Peak of Xinyao
Xinyao was considered to be at its peak in the 1980s as the songs propelled many Singaporean singers and songwriters to stardom. It was during this period where many students who loved xinyao gathered and staged their own performances. Some of the earliest xinyao groups includes The Straws (水草三重唱), The Merlion (鱼尾狮小组), and Underpass Group (地下铁小组). This movement soon spread across Singapore, beyond schools and into the public arena such as community centres. Led by The Merlion, which was formed at Clementi Community Centre in 1983, there were more than 20 xinyao groups registered with a neighbourhood community centre by mid-1987 ..

Songs such as A Step at a Time written and sung by xinyao artists were popular with those born in the mid-1960s to 1970s. In 1983, the song Encounter, a duet by Moo and Huang Hui-zhen, became the first xinyao song to make it to the Mandarin pop song ranking chart "Pick of Pops" (新加坡龙虎榜) on Singapore's radio station, YES 933. The song was part of a xinyao album Tomorrow 21 (明天21) released in 1983-84 and were created by Billy Koh, Koh Nam Seng, Huang Yuan Cheng, Zhang Jia Qiang and Colin Goh, was considered by some fans as the landmark album that brought xinyao to the mainstream media. The creation of this album led to the birth of what would become Ocean Butterflies International, a major Singaporean/Pan-Asian music publishing house.

1990s: Decline of Xinyao
The decline of xinyao began in the early 1990s. Despite constant efforts to promote the xinyao genre such as xinyao concerts and inter-school songwriting competitions, the popularity of xinyao continue to wane. Following the stop of the Xinyao Festival in 1990 due to the lack of funding, the Sing Music Awards was consequently scrapped due to limited album releases. Other factors contributing the decline of xinyao including the rise of Taiwanese and Hong Kong songs in Singapore's music industry, as the declining of new xinyao talents in Singapore.

2000s: Resurgence of Xinyao
Xinyao was revived in the early 2000s when a series of xinyao concerts caught the eye of the public once again. A reunion concert in March 2002 where xinyao pioneers such as Moo, Liang and Gan were featured. Beginning in 2002, an annual xinyao concert featuring xinyao veterans were organised, with Taiwanese singers participating to promote the concert.

The revival of xinyao has been attributed to nostalgia for the era among the generations who grew up listening to that music genre. In recent times, Xinyao stirred the interest of the younger generations as well. Reality competitions such as Project SuperStar and Campus SuperStar were also organised in television to promote the xinyao culture.

Today, xinyao is regarded as a key highlight of Singapore's music scene in the 1980s. Although some argue that any current local compositions by young musicians are considered part of xinyao, the term generally refers to the folk genre of songs by Singaporeans that emerged in the 1980s.

Significance
The xinyao movement was largely home-grown and enriched the local arts scene in post-war Singapore. It was one of the more notable youth music subcultures in Singapore which outgrew its origins and gained public acceptance as well as support.

As a young nation, Singapore was still in the process of nation building in the 1980s, and different campaigns were constantly launched in search of constructing a national identity and “characteristics” that are unique to Singapore. Using lyrics that relates closely to the daily lives of Singaporean youth, xinyao brought out a music culture that aptly represented Singapore in a unique way.

Social Influences

Media
One of the very crucial and deciding factors that pushed xinyao towards its level of popularity was the increased exposure in radio stations as well as on television. In 1983, there was a weekly half-hour radio programme that was specially dedicated for xinyao and its musicians. The programme was titled Our Singers and Songwriters (歌韵心声) and started by the then Singapore Broadcasting Corporation (SBC). In the same year, SBC broadened its annual Chinese Talentime (斗歌竞艺) programme , to include a vocal group section. Following its success, it then further expanded to include a local-composition category in 1985. As an effort to promote xinyao, the SBC also used xinyao songs as theme songs for Chinese television drama serials.

The xinyao movement was further strengthened with the release of the first xinyao album in 1984 titled Tomorrow We’ll Be 21 (明天21).

Following its revival, xinyao starts to reappear in the eyes of the public. In 2007, xinyao was showcased in The Chinese-language musical If There're Seasons (天冷就回来), the musical featured 30 of Liang's compositions, of which many were his signature xinyao pieces. In 2015, a xinyao documentary The Songs We Sang was released in Golden Village.

In 2018, a Singaporean reality-competition series organised by Mediacorp, titled SPOP Sing!, targets local students from Singapore in search of finding a homegrown musical talent as well as promoting local music culture of both mandopop and xinyao, as well as paying tribute to modern singers that rose to fame, such as Sing! China finalists Nathan Hartono and Joanna Dong. A competition with a similar format aired in 2013, the fourth season of Campus Superstar, also use only mandopop and xinyao music only during the competition.

National Day Parade
Xinyao songs such as Voices from the Heart (小人物的心声) were also staged and performance during the 2014 and 2017's National Day Parade in Singapore.

During his Chinese National Day Rally speech  in 2014, Singapore's Prime Minister Lee Hsien Loong started off by singing to a popular xinyao tune, Small Stream that Flows Forever (细水长流) by Liang

Education
In 2015, a school xinyao programme was introduced by Singapore's Ministry of Education. The programme includes a singing, songwriting competition and media appreciation sessions and songwriting workshops. The aim of the programme is to enhance student's Chinese learning abilities in terms of writing and reading. As part of the effort to revive the xinyao spirit and to help participating students, 20 xinyao music appreciation sessions and 2 songwriting workshops were conducted by veteran xinyao songwriters - Jim Lim, Roy Li, Zhang Lesheng and Tan Kah Beng. The programme can be deemed to be a success as over 10,000 students participated in its 2017 iteration. The success of the programme has also led to the production of SPOP Sing!.

Examples of Xinyao Songs

See also
 That Girl in Pinafore, a 2013 comedy-musical film directed by Chai Yee Wei inspired by xinyao
 The Songs We Sang, a 2015 documentary film about xinyao directed by Eva Tang
 Crescendo the Musical, a 2016 musical inspired by xinyao
 SPOP Sing!, a 2018 reality-singing xinyao/mandopop-themed competition organised by Mediacorp Channel 8

References

Singaporean music
C-pop
Pop music genres